Loto may refer to:

 Loto (actor), Cambodian actor
 Loto (band), a Portuguese band
 Loto (crater), a crater on Mars
 Loto (Pukapuka), a village on the island of Wale in the Pukapuka atoll of the Cook Islands
 Loto, various lotteries, see list of lotteries
Lockout–tagout or LOTO, a safety procedure
 Leader of the Opposition, a role in Parliamentary systems of government